Nottawa Creek (also known as Nottawa River, Nottawaseepe River, and Nottawaseppe River) is a  stream in the U.S. state of Michigan that flows into the  St. Joseph River at , approximately three miles east of the village of Mendon.

The Nottawa is formed by the outflow of Nottawa Lake in south central Calhoun County. The lake is fed by Nottawa Drain, which along with Goose Pond Drain drains an area to the east of the lake. The Nottawa Creek flows northwest from the lake then arcs to the southwest and flows through the village of Athens before joining the St. Joseph River.

The Nottawa Creek system drains all or portions of the following townships:
 In Calhoun County
 Athens Township
 Burlington Township
 Clarendon Township
 Eckford Township
 Fredonia Township
 Leroy Township (via Pine Creek)
 Newton Township
 Tekonsha Township
 In Branch County
 Sherwood Township
 In Kalamazoo County
 Climax Township (via Bear Creek)
 Wakeshma Township (via Bear Creek)
 In St. Joseph County
 Leonidas Township

Tributaries 
 (left) Bear Creek
 (left) Pine Creek
 (right) Histand Drain
 (left) Waterman Drain
 (left) Miller and Melody Drain
 (right) Houghton Drain
 Cotton Lake
 (right) Rowe and Wallace Drain
 (right) French Drain
 (right) Alder Creek
 (left) Mud Creek
 (right) Yost Francisco Drain
 Hyde Lake
 (right) Gleason Drain
 (left) unnamed drain
 Fish Lake
 Lyon Lake
 Long Lake
 Pine Lake
 Nottawa Lake
 Klingaman Lake
 Nottawa Drain
 (left) Goose Pond Drain

See also
Nottawaseppi Huron Band of Potawatomi
Notawasepe Potawatamie Reservation

References 

Rivers of Michigan
Rivers of Calhoun County, Michigan
Rivers of Branch County, Michigan
Rivers of St. Joseph County, Michigan
Rivers of Kalamazoo County, Michigan
Tributaries of Lake Michigan